Mannachanallur is a Town in Tiruchirappalli district in the Indian state of Tamil Nadu. Mannachanallur is famous for rice mills

Demographics
 India census, Mannachanallur had a population of 25,931. Males constitute 49% of the population and females 51%. Mannachanallur has an average literacy rate of 78%, higher than the national average of 59.5%: male literacy is 80%, and female literacy is 69%. In Mannachanallur, 11% of the population is under 6 years of age. There are 40 villages in this taluk.

Transportation
Mannachanallur is well connected by road. The state highways SH62 pass through Mannachanallur. There are regular buses to Thuraiyur.
Mannachanallur is also well connected to the neighbouring villages by mini buses. The nearest railway station and airport is located in Trichy,near connected samayapuram bye pass chennai highway

Importance and news
Mannachanallur became a new assembly constituency of Tamil Nadu since the last elections. The constituency's Former MLA Mr.T.P.Poonachi Muthuraja had also become a minister for Khadi and Village Industries in the current Tamil Nadu cabinet.
Current MLA of Mannachanallur - Mr.Mannachanallur S.Kathiravan 
Mannachanallur Giridharan, a noted music director hails from this town. mannachanallur Moorthi pachamuthu living on near kalpalayam meen thotti area

References

Neighbourhoods and suburbs of Tiruchirappalli